is a city located in Nagasaki Prefecture, Japan. As of September 30, 2022, the city has an estimated population of 98,237 and a population density of 750 persons per km2. Its total area is 126.33 km2, and it includes Nagasaki Airport.

History

Ōmura is a castle town, and was the capital of Ōmura Domain, ruled by the local Ōmura clan for over 900 years in pre-Meiji Japan. It was the site of considerable foreign trade and missionary activity during the late Muromachi period, and the Catholic saint Marina de Omura hails from this city. Due to its proximity to the trading settlement at Dejima in Nagasaki, was one of the first areas of Japan to re-open to foreign contact after the end of the national seclusion policy after the Meiji Restoration. In the opera Madama Butterfly, set in nearby Nagasaki, the place name Omara in the line "ed alla damigella Butterfly del quartiere d'Omara Nagasaki" probably refers to Ōmura. From 1868-1945, Ōmura was host to numerous military facilities as part of the Sasebo Naval District, most notably that of a major air base for the Imperial Japanese Navy Air Service. The former naval base was the location of the squalid Ōmura Migrant Detention Center, where mainly Korean refugees—termed "stowaways" (mikkōsha synonymous with "smuggler")—were held until deportation, frequently for several years. Since August 1996 the nearby Ōmura Immigration Reception Center in a modern building serves the same function.

The modern city was founded in 1942 after a town and several villages were municipalized by the prefecture. The city was largely destroyed by American bombing in 1944. After the war, Omura hosted Japan's first motorboat racing event in 1952. Additionally in 1975, the city opened the world's first island airport; Nagasaki Airport which is located offshore in Ōmura Bay. The airport was constructed by reclaiming land on Minoshima Island after the island's residents agreed to relocate to replace the former airport which is now used by the Japan Maritime Self-Defense Force.<ref name="History1"/

Geography

Surrounding municipalities 

 Nagasaki Prefecture
 Higashisonogi
 Isahaya
 Saga Prefecture
 Kashima
 Tara
 Ureshino

Climate
Ōmura has a humid subtropical climate (Köppen:Cfa) with hot summers and cool winters.

Demographics
Per Japanese census data, the population of Ōmura in 2022 is 98,237 people. Ōmura has been conducting censuses since 1960. Although the city's population declined slightly in the 1960s, Ōmura's population has been growing since 1970.

Transportation

Air

 Nagasaki Airport

Railways

 JR Kyushu
 Nishi Kyushu Shinkansen: Shin-Ōmura
 Ōmura Line: Matsubara - Omura Depot - Takematsu - Shin-Ōmura - Suwa - Omura - Iwamatsu

Economy

Ōmura has a mixed economy, with the manufacture of refractory bricks as a major industry. Dairy and poultry farming, as well as cultured pearls are also of importance. However, due to its proximity to the larger urban centers of Nagasaki and Sasebo, Ōmura also serves as bedroom community for both cities.

Oriental Air Bridge, a regional airline, is headquartered in the city. At one time J-Air had its headquarters at the airport.

Sports

Ōmura hosted the official 2011 Asian Basketball Championship for Women.

Sister City relations
  Sintra, Portugal
  San Carlos, California, USA
  Semboku, Akita, Japan
  Itami, Hyōgo, Japan

Friendly Cities
  Minhang District, Shanghai, China

Notable people
 Hantaro Nagaoka, Meiji-era physicist
 Anza Ohyama, singer and stage actress
 Masaki Okino, footballer
 Taira Shige, footballer

References

External links

 

Cities in Nagasaki Prefecture